The Tahiti national rugby sevens team competes in the Pacific Games and the Oceania Sevens. In the 2011 Pacific Games held in New Caledonia they finished in 10th place losing to Vanuatu 7 – 17 in the Ninth place playoffs.

Squad
Squad to 2015 Pacific Games:
Manuarii Richmond
Desire Takatai
Haley Teuira
Teuira Frogier
Andoni Jiminez
Makalea Foliaki
Taitearii Mahuru
Andrew Vanaa
Anthony Tesquet
Francois Tardieu
Jean-Teiva Jacquelain
Vincent Perez

Previous Squads

See also

Rugby union in Tahiti

References

Rugby union in French Polynesia
Rugby union in Tahiti
National rugby sevens teams
R